The Journal of Orthopaedic & Sports Physical Therapy is a peer-reviewed medical journal covering research about musculoskeletal rehabilitation, orthopaedics, physical therapy, and sports medicine. It was established in 1979, following the founding of the Orthopedic and Sports Medicine sections of the American Physical Therapy Association and resulted from a  merger of the Bulletin of the Orthopaedic Section and the Bulletin of the Sports Medicine Section. Initially published quarterly, the journal is now monthly. It is abstracted and indexed by PubMed/MEDLINE and CINAHL.

External links
 

Publications established in 1979
Orthopedics journals
Physical therapy journals
English-language journals
Delayed open access journals